Stigmella geranica is a moth of the family Nepticulidae. It was described by Scoble in 1978. It is found in South Africa (it was described from Natal).

The larvae feed on Geranium cf pulchrum species. They probably mine the leaves of their host plant.

References

Endemic moths of South Africa
Nepticulidae
Moths of Africa
Moths described in 1978